Lemonade is a drink made with lemons.

Lemonade may also refer to:

Drinks

 Lemon-Lime soft drinks, referred to as "Lemonade" in Australia and New Zealand
 Lemonade fruit, a hybrid citrus fruit found in Australia and New Zealand
 Red lemonade, soft drink available in Ireland

Music 
 Lemonade (band), an alternative dance band from San Francisco, California

Albums 
 Lemonade (Mucky Pup album), 1992
 Lemonade (EP), a 2004 EP by Wheatus
 Lemonade (G. Love album), 2006
 Lemonade (Beyoncé album), 2016

Songs 
 "Lemonade" (Adam Friedman song), 2016
 "Lemonade" (Alexandra Stan song), 2012
 "Lemonade" (CocoRosie song), 2010
 "Lemonade" (Gucci Mane song), 2010
 "Lemonade" (Internet Money and Gunna song), 2020
 "Lemonade" (Sophie song), 2014
 "Lemonade", a song and single by Chris Rice from album What A Heart Is Beating For, 2007
 "Lemonade", a song by Blind Melon from Soup
 "Lemonade", a song by Boys Noize & Erol Alkan
 "Lemonade", a song by Danity Kane
 "Lemonade", a song by Planet Funk

Plays and films
Lemonade, a play by Eve Ensler
Lemonade, a play by James Prideaux
Beyoncé: Lemonade, a film released together with the album Lemonade in 2016
Lemonade (2018 film), a Romanian drama

Companies
Lemonade, Inc., an insurance company operating in the U.S.

See also
 Lemonade Profile, an extension to the IMAP standard for email
 Lemonade Tycoon, an online business simulation game
 Keith Lemon's Lemonaid, a British television series
 Lemoned Plant, formerly simply Lemoned, a Japanese record label and retail store franchise
 Ramune, a Japanese soft drink
 Lamune (visual novel), a Japanese romantic video game and anime